The motor cortex is the region of the cerebral cortex believed to be involved in the planning, control, and execution of voluntary movements.
The motor cortex is an area of the frontal lobe located in the posterior precentral gyrus immediately anterior to the central sulcus.

Components of the motor cortex

The motor cortex can be divided into three areas:

1. The primary motor cortex is the main contributor to generating neural impulses that pass down to the spinal cord and control the execution of movement.  However, some of the other motor areas in the brain also play a role in this function. It is located on the anterior paracentral lobule on the medial surface.

2. The premotor cortex is responsible for some aspects of motor control, possibly including the preparation for movement, the sensory guidance of movement, the spatial guidance of reaching, or the direct control of some movements with an emphasis on control of proximal and trunk muscles of the body. Located anterior to the primary motor cortex.

3. The supplementary motor area (or SMA), has many proposed functions including the internally generated planning of movement, the planning of sequences of movement, and the coordination of the two sides of the body such as in bi-manual coordination. Located on the midline surface of the hemisphere anterior to the primary motor cortex.

 The posterior parietal cortex is sometimes also considered to be part of the group of motor cortical areas; however it is best to regard it as an association cortex rather than motor. It is thought to be responsible for transforming multisensory information into motor commands, and to be responsible for some aspects of motor planning, in addition to many other functions that may not be motor related.
 The primary somatosensory cortex, especially the part called area 3a, which lies directly against the motor cortex, is sometimes considered to be functionally part of the motor control circuitry.

Other brain regions outside the cerebral cortex are also of great importance to motor function, most notably the cerebellum, the basal ganglia, pedunculopontine nucleus and the red nucleus, as well as other subcortical motor nuclei.

The premotor cortex
In the earliest work on the motor cortex, researchers recognized only one cortical field involved in motor control. Alfred Walter Campbell was the first to suggest that there might be two fields, a "primary" motor cortex and an "intermediate precentral" motor cortex. His reasons were largely based on cytoarchitectonics, or the study of the appearance of the cortex under a microscope. The primary motor cortex contains cells with giant cell bodies known as "Betz cells". These cells were mistakenly thought to be the main outputs from the cortex, sending fibers to the spinal cord. It has since been found that Betz cells account for about 2-3% of the projections from the cortex to the spinal cord, or about 10% of the projections from the primary motor cortex to the spinal cord. The specific function of the Betz cells that distinguishes them from other output cells of the motor cortex remains unknown, but they continue to be used as a marker for the primary motor cortex.

Other researchers, such as Oskar Vogt, Cécile Vogt-Mugnier and Otfrid Foerster also suggested that motor cortex was divided into a primary motor cortex (area 4, according to Brodmann's naming scheme) and a higher-order motor cortex (area 6 according to Korbinian Brodmann).

Wilder Penfield notably disagreed and suggested that there was no functional distinction between area 4 and area 6. In his view both were part of the same map, though area 6 tended to emphasize the muscles of the back and neck. Woolsey who studied the motor map in monkeys also believed there was no distinction between primary motor and premotor. M1 was the name for the proposed single map that encompassed both the primary motor cortex and the premotor cortex. Although sometimes "M1" and "primary motor cortex" are used interchangeably, strictly speaking, they derive from different conceptions of motor cortex organization.

Despite the views of Penfield and Woolsey, a consensus emerged that area 4 and area 6 had sufficiently different functions that they could be considered different cortical fields. Fulton  helped to solidify this distinction between a primary motor cortex in area 4 and a premotor cortex in area 6. As Fulton pointed out, and as all subsequent research has confirmed, both primary motor and premotor cortex project directly to the spinal cord and are capable of some direct control of movement. Fulton showed that when the primary motor cortex is damaged in an experimental animal, movement soon recovers; when the premotor cortex is damaged, movement soon recovers; when both are damaged, movement is lost and the animal cannot recover.

The premotor cortex is now generally divided into four sections. First it is divided into an upper (or dorsal) premotor cortex and a lower (or ventral) premotor cortex. Each of these is further divided into a region more toward the front of the brain (rostral premotor cortex) and a region more toward the back (caudal premotor cortex). A set of acronyms are commonly used: PMDr (premotor dorsal, rostral), PMDc, PMVr, PMVc. Some researchers use a different terminology. Field 7 or F7 denotes PMDr; F2 = PMDc; F5=PMVr; F4=PMVc.

PMDc is often studied with respect to its role in guiding reaching. Neurons in PMDc are active during reaching. When monkeys are trained to reach from a central location to a set of target locations, neurons in PMDc are active during the preparation for the reach and also during the reach itself. They are broadly tuned, responding best to one direction of reach and less well to different directions. Electrical stimulation of the PMDc on a behavioral time scale was reported to evoke a complex movement of the shoulder, arm, and hand that resembles reaching with the hand opened in preparation to grasp.

PMDr may participate in learning to associate arbitrary sensory stimuli with specific movements or learning arbitrary response rules. In this sense it may resemble the prefrontal cortex more than other motor cortex fields. It may also have some relation to eye movement. Electrical stimulation in the PMDr can evoke eye movements and neuronal activity in the PMDr can be modulated by eye movement.

PMVc or F4 is often studied with respect to its role in the sensory guidance of movement. Neurons here are responsive to tactile stimuli, visual stimuli, and auditory stimuli. These neurons are especially sensitive to objects in the space immediately surrounding the body, in so-called peripersonal space. Electrical stimulation of these neurons causes an apparent defensive movement as if protecting the body surface. This premotor region may be part of a larger circuit for maintaining a margin of safety around the body and guiding movement with respect to nearby objects.

PMVr or F5 is often studied with respect to its role in shaping the hand during grasping and in interactions between the hand and the mouth. Electrical stimulation of at least some parts of F5, when the stimulation is applied on a behavioral time scale, evokes a complex movement in which the hand moves to the mouth, closes in a grip, orients such that the grip faces the mouth, the neck turns to align the mouth to the hand, and the mouth opens.

Mirror neurons were first discovered in area F5 in the monkey brain by Rizzolatti and colleagues. These neurons are active when the monkey grasps an object. Yet the same neurons become active when the monkey watches an experimenter grasp an object in the same way. The neurons are therefore both sensory and motor. Mirror neurons are proposed to be a basis for understanding the actions of others by internally imitating the actions using one's own motor control circuits.

The supplementary motor cortex
Penfield described a cortical motor area, the supplementary motor area (SMA), on the top or dorsal part of the cortex. Each neuron in the SMA may influence many muscles, many body parts, and both sides of the body. The map of the body in SMA is therefore extensively overlapping. SMA projects directly to the spinal cord and may play some direct role in the control of movement.

Based on early work using brain imaging techniques in the human brain, Roland suggested that the SMA was especially active during the internally generated plan to make a sequence of movements. In the monkey brain, neurons in the SMA are active in association with specific learned sequences of movement.

Others have suggested that, because the SMA appears to control movement bilaterally, it may play a role in inter-manual coordination.

Yet others have suggested that, because of the direct projection of SMA to the spinal cord and because of its activity during simple movements, it may play a direct role in motor control rather than solely a high level role in planning sequences.

On the basis of the movements evoked during electrical stimulation, it has been suggested that the SMA may have evolved in primates as a specialist in the part of the motor repertoire involving climbing and other complex locomotion.

Based on the pattern of projections to the spinal cord, it has been suggested that another set of motor areas may lie next to the supplementary motor area, on the medial (or midline) wall of the hemisphere. These medial areas are termed the cingulate motor areas. Their functions are not yet understood.

History
In 1870, Eduard Hitzig and Gustav Fritsch demonstrated that electrical stimulation of certain parts of the dog brain resulted in muscular contraction on the opposite side of the body.

A little later, in 1874, David Ferrier, working in the laboratory of the West Riding Lunatic Asylum at Wakefield (at the invitation of its director, James Crichton-Browne), mapped the motor cortex in the monkey brain using electrical stimulation.  He found that the motor cortex contained a rough map of the body with the feet at the top (or dorsal part) of the brain and the face at the bottom (or ventral part) of the brain. He also found that when electrical stimulation was maintained for a longer time, such as for a second, instead of being discharged over a fraction of a second, then some coordinated, seemingly meaningful movements could be caused, instead of only muscle twitches.

After Ferrier's discovery, many neuroscientists used electrical stimulation to study the map of the motor cortex in many animals including monkeys, apes, and humans.

One of the first detailed maps of the human motor cortex was described in 1905 by Campbell. He did autopsies on the brains of amputees. A person who had lost an arm would over time apparently lose some of the neuronal mass in the part of the motor cortex that normally controls the arm. Likewise, a person who had lost a leg would show degeneration in the leg part of motor cortex. In this way the motor map could be established. In the period between 1919 and 1936 others mapped the motor cortex in detail using electrical stimulation, including the husband and wife team Vogt and Vogt, and the neurosurgeon Foerster.

Perhaps the best-known experiments on the human motor map were published by Penfield in 1937. Using a procedure that was common in the 1930s, he examined epileptic patients who were undergoing brain surgery. These patients were given a local anesthetic, their skulls were opened, and their brains exposed. Then, electrical stimulation was applied to the surface of the brain to map out the speech areas.  In this way, the surgeon would be able to avoid any damage to speech circuitry. The brain focus of the epilepsy could then be surgically removed. During this procedure, Penfield mapped the effect of electrical stimulation in all parts of the cerebral cortex, including motor cortex.

Penfield is sometimes mistakenly considered to be the discoverer of the map in motor cortex.  It was discovered approximately 70 years before his work.  However, Penfield drew a picture of a human-like figure stretched over the cortical surface and used the term "homunculus" (diminutive of "homo", Latin for "man") to refer to it. It is perhaps for this reason that his work has become so popular in neuroscience.

The motor cortex map
A simple view, that is almost certainly too limited and that dates back to the earliest work on the motor cortex, is that neurons in the motor cortex control movement by a feed-forward direct pathway. In that view, a neuron in the motor cortex sends an axon or projection to the spinal cord and forms a synapse on a motor neuron. The motor neuron sends an electrical impulse to a muscle. When the neuron in the cortex becomes active, it causes a muscle contraction. The greater the activity in the motor cortex, the stronger the muscle force. Each point in the motor cortex controls a muscle or a small group of related muscles. This description is only partly correct.

Most neurons in the motor cortex that project to the spinal cord synapse on interneuron circuitry in the spinal cord, not directly onto motor neurons. One suggestion is that the direct, cortico-motoneuronal projections are a specialization that allows for the fine control of the fingers.

The view that each point in the motor cortex controls a muscle or a limited set of related muscles was debated over the entire history of research on the motor cortex, and was suggested in its strongest and most extreme form by Asanuma on the basis of experiments in cats and monkeys using electrical stimulation. However, almost every other experiment to examine the map, including the classic work of Ferrier and of Penfield showed that each point in the motor cortex influences a range of muscles and joints. The map is greatly overlapping. The overlap in the map is generally greater in the premotor cortex and supplementary motor cortex, but even the map in the primary motor cortex controls muscles in an extensively overlapped manner. Many studies have demonstrated the overlapping representation of muscles in the motor cortex.

It is believed that as an animal learns a complex movement repertoire, the motor cortex gradually comes to coordinate among muscles.

The clearest example of the coordination of muscles into complex movement in the motor cortex comes from the work of Graziano and colleagues on the monkey brain. They used electrical stimulation on a behavioral time scale, such as for half a second instead of the more typical hundredth of a second. They found that this type of stimulation of the monkey motor cortex often evoked complex, meaningful actions. For example, stimulation of one site in the cortex would cause the hand to close, move to the mouth, and the mouth to open. Stimulation of another site would cause the hand to open, rotate until the grip faced outward, and the arm to project out as if the animal were reaching. Different complex movements were evoked from different sites and these movements were mapped in the same orderly manner in all monkeys tested. Computational models showed that the normal movement repertoire of a monkey, if arranged on a sheet such that similar movements are placed near each other, will result in a map that matches the actual map found in the monkey motor cortex. This work suggests that the motor cortex does not truly contain a homunculus-type map of the body. Instead, the deeper principle may be a rendering of the movement repertoire onto the cortical surface. To the extent that the movement repertoire breaks down partly into the actions of separate body parts, the map contains a rough and overlapping body arrangement noted by researchers over the past century.

A similar organization by typical movement repertoire has been reported in the posterior parietal cortex of monkeys and galagos and in the motor cortex of rats and mice.

Evolution of the motor cortex

Mammals evolved from mammal-like reptiles over 200 million years ago. These early mammals developed several novel brain functions most likely due to the novel sensory processes that were necessary for the nocturnal niche that these mammals occupied. These animals most likely had a somatomotor cortex, where somatosensory information and motor information were processed in the same cortical region. This allowed for the acquisition of only simple motor skills, such as quadrupedal locomotion and striking of predators or prey. Placental mammals evolved a discrete motor cortex about 100 mya. According to the principle of proper mass, "the mass of neural tissue controlling a particular function is appropriate to the amount of information processing involved in performing the function." This suggests that the development of a discrete motor cortex was advantageous for placental mammals, and the motor skills that these organisms acquired were more complex than their early-mammalian ancestors. Further, this motor cortex was necessary for the arboreal lifestyles of our primate ancestors.

Enhancements to the motor cortex (and the presence of opposable thumbs and stereoscopic vision) were evolutionarily selected to prevent primates from making mistakes in the dangerous motor skill of leaping between tree branches (Cartmill, 1974; Silcox, 2007). As a result of this pressure, the motor system of arboreal primates has a disproportionate degree of somatotopic representation of the hands and feet, which is essential for grasping (Nambu, 2011; Pons et al., 1985; Gentilucci et al., 1988).

See also
 Cortical homunculus
 Motor skill

References

Further reading
 Canavero S. Textbook of therapeutic cortical stimulation. New York: Nova Science, 2009

External links
Motor Cortex

Cerebral cortex
Motor system